Koulandougou is a commune in the Cercle of Bla in the Ségou Region of Mali. The administrative center (chef-lieu) is the village of N'Toba.

References

External links
.

Communes of Ségou Region